Ahmed Omran is an Egyptian footballer. He currently plays for ENPPI Club in the Egyptian Premier League. He was a member of the Egyptian U-20 squad that won the title of the 2003 African Youth Championship held in Burkina Faso.

Club career
In summer of 2009, he was reported that he had signed to join El Gouna FC as well as Petrojet. It was El Gouna who eventually won his services as the Egyptian Football Association ruled for its favor.

External links
 Ahmed Omran Profile at Gouna's Website (Arabic)

1983 births
Egyptian footballers
Zamalek SC players
Living people
ENPPI SC players
Egyptian Premier League players
Association football midfielders